Wild Heritage is a 1958 American CinemaScope Western film directed by Charles F. Haas and starring Will Rogers, Jr., Maureen O'Sullivan and Rod McKuen.

Plot
Emma Breslin (O'Sullivan) and her family cross the plains in a covered wagon. They make the fateful decision to pause in a lawless western town where Emma's husband, Jake (Paul Birch), is shot by rustlers Arn (John Beradino) and Jud. But folksy Judge Copeland (Rogers) persuades them to go on. At Break Wagon Hill, their wagon does just that and they decide to homestead on the spot.

The movie follows the trials and joys of Emma and her family, as well as those of their neighbors, the Bascombs (Donahue and Jeanette Nolan). Finally, violence reappears when Arn and Jud show up on their homestead, leading to a showdown with the Breslin Boys (McKuen, Gary Gray and George Winslow).

Cast
 Will Rogers, Jr. as Judge Copeland 
 Maureen O'Sullivan as Emma Breslin
 Rod McKuen as Dirk Breslin
 Casey Tibbs as Rusty - Trail Boss
 Judi Meredith as Callie Bascomb (as Judy Meredith)
 Troy Donahue as Jesse Bascomb
 George Winslow as Talbot Breslin
 Gigi Perreau as 'Missouri' Breslin
 Gary Gray as Hugh Adam David Breslin
 Jeanette Nolan as Ma (Janet) Bascomb
 Paul Birch as Jake Birch
 John Beradino as Arn - Rustler
 Phil Harvey as Jud - Rustler
 Lawrence Dobkin as Josh Burrage
 Stephen Ellsworth as Bolivar Bascomb
 Ingrid Goude as Hilda Jansen - Blacksmith's Daughter 
 Christoper Dark as Brazos - Trail Drive Cowhand
 Guy Wilkerson as Chaco - Trail Drive Cook

See also
 List of American films of 1958

External links
 
 
 

1958 films
1958 Western (genre) films
American Western (genre) films
Films directed by Charles F. Haas
Universal Pictures films
1950s English-language films
1950s American films